Nidal Hilal DSc PhD  EurIng CEng  FIChemE FLSW is an academic, engineering scientist and scientific adviser. He is a Global Network Professor  at New York University, the Founding Director and Principal Investigator of NYUAD Water Research Center. He held professorships at the University of Nottingham and Swansea University in the United Kingdom. He is an Emeritus Professor of Engineering at Swansea University and the Founding Director of the Centre for Water Advanced Technologies and Environmental Research (CWATER).

Education 
Hilal obtained a Bachelor's degree in Chemical Engineering in 1981 followed by three years industrial experience in the oil industry. He obtained a Master of Science degree in Advanced Chemical Engineering in 1985 followed by a PhD in Chemical Engineering in 1988 from Swansea University. He also holds a Postgraduate Certificate in Higher Education from the University of Nottingham in the United Kingdom.

Career 
Hilal worked as a lecturer in Chemical Engineering at the University of Nottingham from 2001 to 2003, when he was promoted to a Reader in Chemical and Process Engineering. He was promoted to a Chair Professor in Chemical and Process Engineering (Personal Chair) in December 2004 at the School of Chemical, Environmental and Mining Engineering until August 2010. He moved to Swansea University as the Chair Professor in Water Process Engineering and established the Centre for Water Advanced Technologies and Environmental Research (CWATER). He was also the Head of Chemical and Environmental Engineering at Swansea University from September 2010 until February 2012 when he was seconded to Masdar Institute of Science and Technology in Abu Dhabi and held the position of Provost and Chief Academic Officer until end of December 2013. He moved in 2018 to New York University - Abu Dhabi Campus as a Global Network Professor and established NYUAD Water Research Center.

Honours and awards 
Hilal is a chartered engineer in the UK, a registered European Engineer (Eur Ing) and is an elected fellow of both the Institution of Chemical Engineers (IChemE) and the Learned Society of Wales (LSW). Hilal was awarded the 2020 Menelaus Medal by the Learned Society of Wales for excellence in engineering and technology. In 2005 he was awarded a Doctor of Science from the University of Wales and the Kuwait Prize for applied science "Water Resources Development". 
Hilal has been named in the Highly Cited Researchers 2022 list by Clarivate.  Hilal is listed in the most Notable Alumni of Swansea University. Hilal is listed in the 21st-century famous British engineers.

Research 
Hilal has supervised 46 students through their PhDs and more than 70 postdoctoral research fellows, authored over 500 publications including several patents and books. His research interests lie broadly in the identification of innovative and cost-effective solutions within the fields of nano-water, membrane technology, and water treatment including desalination, colloid engineering and the nano-engineering applications of AFM. His internationally recognized research has led to the use of AFM in the development of new membranes with optimized properties for difficult separations. His research has produced several breakthrough innovations, including: smallest AFM colloid probe reported in the literature, first AFM coated colloid probe technique, first AFM cell probe technique, first direct measurements of the interaction of single live cells with surfaces, first use of the atomic force microscope in meso-scale cavitation studies, development of novel and tailored membranes and the development of self-cleaning membrane for sustainable desalination.
Hilal is ranked amongst the top scientists in the world. He is ranked by google scholar in the top 10 desalination leaders around the world  and he is also ranked number 169 in the world ranking for Engineering and Technology. Hilal is the most cited author in Desalination journal in 55 years (1966-2021) and because of this, he is the most cited author (life time) in Desalination. He is also the most cited author in Journal of Water Process Engineering.

Books 
 Electrically Conductive Membrane Materials and Systems: Fouling Mitigation For Desalination and Water Treatment. .
 Nanofiltration for Sustainability: Reuse, Recycle and Resource Recovery. .
 Osmosis Engineering. .
 Nanofiber membranes for medical, environmental and energy applications. .
 Membrane-based salinity gradient processes for water treatment and power generation. .
 Membrane Characterization. .
 Membrane Fabrication. .
 Boron Separation Processes. .
 Membrane Modification: Technology and Applications. .
 Atomic Force Microscopy and Process Engineering. .

Advisory and editorial boards 
Hilal served as editor-in-chief for Desalination journal  from the 1st of June 2009 until the end of December 2021. He sits on the editorial boards of a number of international journals, is an advisory board member of several multinational organizations and has served on/consulted for industry, government departments, research councils and universities on an international basis.

References 

Alumni of the University of Wales
Welsh scientists
British chemical engineers
Living people
1958 births
20th-century Welsh scientists
21st-century Welsh scientists
20th-century British engineers
21st-century British engineers